Carlos Dias may refer to:

 Carlos Dias (fencer) (1910–1995), Portuguese épée fencer
 Carlos Alberto Dias (born 1967), Brazilian football striker
 Cafú (footballer, born 1993), Carlos Miguel Ribeiro Dias, Brazilian football midfielder
 Carlos Dias (footballer) (born 2000), Brazilian football midfielder

See also
 Carlos Diaz (disambiguation)